The 1977 Australian Formula 2 Championship was a CAMS sanctioned national motor racing title for drivers of Australian Formula 2 racing cars. The championship was contested over a single race which was staged at the Sandown International Motor Racing Circuit in Victoria on 17 April 1977.

Results

References

External links
 Australian Titles Retrieved from CAMS Online Manual of Motor Sport on 1 September 2008
 1977 AF2C Results Retrieved from oldracingcars.com on 1 September 2008

Australian Formula 2 Championship
Formula 2 Championship
Motorsport at Sandown